PS Keystone State (also spelled Key Stone State) was a wooden-hulled American paddle steamer in service between 1849 and 1861. She was built in 1848 in Buffalo, New York, by Bidwell & Banta for ship-owner Charles M. Reed of Erie, Pennsylvania, and operated as part of his "Chicago Line". A luxuriously furnished palace steamer, she operated between Buffalo and Chicago, Illinois, while also making stops at various other ports. She was built for the passenger and package freight trade, frequently carrying both wealthy passengers and European immigrants who desired to settle in the Midwestern United States. Due to the Panic of 1857, Keystone State and several other paddle steamers were laid up. When the American Civil War began in 1861; she was refurbished, and put back into service.

On November 8, 1861, Keystone State left Detroit for Milwaukee, Wisconsin, under the command of Captain Wilkes Travers. Although her cargo manifest listed her cargo as farm machinery, it was rumored that this was a cover for military supplies and gold. She was last seen off Port Austin, Michigan, struggling in a storm, and eventually sank with the loss of all 33 people on board. Keystone States fate was unknown for over a week, until pieces of wreckage washed ashore.

The location of Keystone States wreck remained a mystery for 151 years, until it was found in July 2013 by shipwreck hunter David Trotter.

History

Design and construction

Keystone State (also spelled Key Stone State) was built in 1848 by Bidwell & Banta of Buffalo, New York. By the time she was completed, Keystone State was the second largest ship on the Great Lakes, after the paddle steamer Empire State. She was named in honor of the Commonwealth of Pennsylvania. Keystone State was a so-called palace steamer, a class of Great Lakes paddle steamers known for their lavish interiors. Maritime historian Robert McGreevy wrote that the interiors of palace steamers "were made to look like the finest hotels", and had "leaded glass windows and carved arches and mahogany trim". The joiner work for Keystone State was done by carpenter John M. Smith. Newspapers reported that her main cabin was designed by a Captain E. Powers, although Smith later claimed to have designed it.

She had a gross tonnage of 1354 tons.

The engine was manufactured in New York City. Steam for the engine was provided by two firebox boilers. She was launched on November 11, 1848.

Service history

In 1849, Keystone State was enrolled in Presque Isle, Pennsylvania. Built for ship-owner Charles M. Reed of Erie, Pennsylvania, Keystone State became part of his "Chicago Line". Keystone State made two trips to Erie and Detroit, Michigan, respectively, to test her machinery. That same month, she began traveling between Buffalo and Chicago, Illinois, while also making stops at other ports such as Sandusky, Ohio, and Milwaukee, Wisconsin. Built for the passenger and package freight trade, she frequently carried both affluent passengers and European immigrants who desired to settle in the Midwestern United States. She also carried barreled goods, such as flour.

In October 1849, Keystone State was damaged and disabled in a gale on Lake Michigan, breaking one of her "hogging arches". On April 15, 1850, Keystone State rescued the passengers of the paddle steamer Atlantic, which had run aground on Point Pelee. On June 8 that same year, Keystone State collided with the schooner Comfort Ann off Rocky River, Ohio. Keystone State rescued the crew of the schooner S.F. Gale, which sank in a collision with the schooner Telegraph in the Detroit River on November 11, 1850.

Keystone State traveled to Put-in-Bay, Ohio, on August 6, 1851. On December 17 that same year, while running between Buffalo, Dunkirk, New York, and Detroit, with 3,500 barrels of flour and 1,000 dressed pigs, Keystone State became trapped in ice at Malden, Ontario. She began making regular trips between Dunkirk and Detroit in 1852. On November 12, 1852, the crew of Keystone State sighted a steamboat, which they believed to be Oneida. The following day, Keystone State and another paddle steamer, Lady Elgin, were damaged while attempting to enter Dunkirk harbor during a storm. On November 18, the Daily News of Kingston, Ontario, reported an unconfirmed rumor that Keystone State and Empire State had collided near Erie.

On October 10, 1853, one of Keystone States boilers exploded in the lower Detroit River, after one of her flues collapsed. She did not sustain major damage, and was towed to Detroit for repairs by the paddle steamer Mayflower. In 1854, Keystone State arrived in Buffalo with a bad leak. She sustained $3,000 (equivalent to $ in ) worth of damage, and was dry docked for repairs. In 1855, Keystone State ran between Collingwood, Ontario, and Chicago, while also making stops in Sault Ste. Marie, Michigan.

While running between Collingwood and Chicago on September 18, 1856, Keystone State sprang a leak in a gale on Lake Michigan; her starboard cabin was also smashed in. She was repaired in Detroit. Due to the Panic of 1857, Keystone State and several other paddle steamers were laid up. When the American Civil War began in 1861, she was refurbished, and put back into service. She was sold on October 30, 1861; her owners included G. Ritter and Frank Handel. Keystone State re-entered service on November 7, when she arrived in Detroit.

Final voyage
On November 8, 1861, Keystone State left Detroit for Milwaukee under the command of Captain Wilkes Travers. Although her manifest listed her cargo as farm machinery, historians now believe that it had been intentionally mislabeled, and she was carrying gold military supplies intended to be used in the Civil War. She was last seen by the schooner Bronson off Port Austin, Michigan, rolling in a storm, and appeared to be disabled. She sank on either November 9 or 10, with the loss of all 33 of her crew. No bodies from Keystone State were ever recovered.

Keystone States fate was unknown for over a week, until pieces of her wreck were spotted on November 21. On November 23, the Detroit Free Press reported that while off Pointe Aux Barques, the steamer City of Cleveland had passed through "large quantities of what they took to be the upper works of some wrecked steamer", later determined to be from Keystone State. A day later, they reported that "part of a guard rail, part of a wheel and a portion of a paddle box of a large steamer" had washed ashore at White Rock, Michigan. The schooner Lookout encountered wreckage such as cabins and a pilot house off Pointe Aux Barques on November 23. The pilot house washed ashore near Lexington, Michigan.

Wreck

Shipwreck hunter David Trotter of Canton, Michigan, located the wreck of Keystone State on the weekend of July 6–7, 2013, using side-scan sonar. Trotter and his team, Undersea Research Associates, were able to identify Keystone States wreck based on her size and features, as she was the only paddle steamer of that size still missing in Lake Huron. The wreck is in a semi-collapsed state, encrusted with zebra mussels. Keystone States stern is relatively broken up, while her engine, boilers and paddle wheels are all still standing, and are in relatively good condition. Trotter and his dive team were unable to find any of the farm machinery or rumored gold, speculating that Keystone States crew jettisoned the cargo in an attempt to keep her afloat. The wreck is surrounded by a large debris field.

Notes

References

Sources

 
 
 
 
 
 
 
 
 
 
 
 
 
 
 
 
 
 
 
 
 
 
 
 
 
 
 
 
 
 
 
 
 
 
 
 
 
 
 
 
 

 

1848 ships
Ships built in Buffalo, New York
Paddle steamers of the United States
Merchant ships of the United States
Great Lakes ships
Shipwrecks of Lake Huron
Shipwrecks of the Michigan coast
2013 archaeological discoveries
Wreck diving sites in the United States
Maritime incidents in October 1849
Maritime incidents in April 1850
Maritime incidents in June 1850
Maritime incidents in November 1850
Maritime incidents in December 1851
Maritime incidents in November 1852
Maritime incidents in October 1853
Maritime incidents in December 1854
Maritime incidents in July 1855
Maritime incidents in November 1855
Maritime incidents in December 1855
Maritime incidents in September 1856
Maritime incidents in November 1861
Ships sunk in storms